Tristan Bangma (born 6 October 1997) is a visually impaired Dutch Paralympic cyclist. He is a gold medalist in cycling at both the 2016 Summer Paralympics and the 2020 Summer Paralympics.

At the 2016 Summer Paralympics held in Rio de Janeiro, Brazil, he won the gold medal in the men's 1 km time trial B with his sighted pilot Teun Mulder. In 2021, he won the gold medal in the men's individual pursuit B at the 2020 Summer Paralympics held in Tokyo, Japan with his sighted pilot Patrick Bos. He also won the silver medal in the men's road race B at the 2020 Summer Paralympics.

Career 

At the 2016 UCI Para-cycling Track World Championships held in Montichiari, Italy, Bangma and Teun Mulder won the silver medal in the Sprint Tandem B event and also in the 1 km time trial Tandem B event.

He also won the silver medal in the 109.3 km road race at the 2017 UCI Para-cycling Road World Championships held in Pietermaritzburg, South Africa. At the 2018 UCI Para-cycling Track World Championships held in Rio de Janeiro, Brazil, he won three medals in total: one silver medal and two bronze medals.

At the 2019 UCI Para-cycling Track World Championships held in Apeldoorn, Netherlands, Bangma and Patrick Bos won the bronze medal in the men's time trial B event.

In 2022, he won two gold medals at the 2022 UCI Para-cycling Road World Championships held in 
Baie-Comeau, Canada. He also won a silver medal at the 2022 UCI Para-cycling Track World Championships held in Saint-Quentin-en-Yvelines, France.

References

External links 
 

Living people
1997 births
Cyclists from Friesland
Cyclists at the 2016 Summer Paralympics
Cyclists at the 2020 Summer Paralympics
Medalists at the 2016 Summer Paralympics
Medalists at the 2020 Summer Paralympics
Paralympic gold medalists for the Netherlands
Paralympic silver medalists for the Netherlands
Paralympic medalists in cycling
Paralympic cyclists with a vision impairment
Paralympic cyclists of the Netherlands
People from Ooststellingwerf
21st-century Dutch people
Dutch blind people